Sun-Maid Growers of California is an American privately owned cooperative of raisin growers headquartered in Fresno, California. Sun-Maid is one of the largest raisin and dried fruit processors in the world. As a cooperative, Sun-Maid is made up of approximately 850 family farmers who grow raisin grapes within a  radius of the processing plant. Sun-Maid also sources dried fruit beyond this geographical area.

Sun-Maid raisins are packaged in a red box featuring the “Sun-Maid Girl” wearing a red sunbonnet and holding a tray of fresh grapes. Sun-Maid raisins are grown in the Central Valley of California, midway between Los Angeles and San Francisco, a region known for its climate perfect for growing grapes to make raisins. The grapes are picked at harvest time, usually late August to early September, and dried in the sun, either by hand-picking them and laying them on paper trays or allowing them to dry-on-the-vine (DOV) for mechanical harvesting. Packaging and shipping to customers throughout the United States and more than 60 countries around the world.

Nearly half of all Sun-Maid raisins are packed for consumer sales, whether in a box, a bag or a canister in varying sizes. The other half are sold as an ingredient to bakeries, cereal companies, as raisin paste and raisin concentrate. The Thompson Seedless grape is the most popular variety used to make raisins. 

Besides raisins, Sun-Maid packs a full line of dried fruit, such as figs, dates, cranberries, apples, prunes, apricots and tropical fruits. Sun-Maid also packs yogurt-covered raisins.

The company maintains extensive brand licensing and food service operations. The Promotion in Motion Companies, Inc., under license from Sun-Maid, produces a Sun-Maid Milk Chocolate Covered Raisins.

History
In 1873, Francis T. Eisen planted an experimental vineyard of Muscat grapes on  along Fancher Creek, just east of Fresno. By 1878, packaged raisins were being shipped out of the state, and by 1903, California was producing 120 million pounds of raisins a year.

Packing houses quickly became a vital link between the grower and the consumer, and dozens sprouted up across the San Joaquin Valley. Employing hundreds of immigrant people, these facilities received the sun-dried raisins from growers, which they stored, processed, packaged, and shipped throughout the United States and to countries around the world. When the transcontinental railroad was completed in 1869, farmers and immigrants from the East settled the area for the first time, and growers were able to quickly transport products from the West to new markets. In 1872, Leland Stanford brought the Central Pacific Railroad to the San Joaquin Valley, choosing a location in present-day downtown Fresno as the rail stop, Fresno Station. Depots in surrounding communities soon followed. As the railroads expanded, so too did the area surrounding Fresno Station, attracting farmers to grow agricultural products to satisfy the increasing demand from faraway markets. Many of the families suffered due to harmful chemicals that they were faced with while working on the farms.

Once raisins were established as a marketable crop which grew and dried well under the Californian sun, raisin grape-growing areas expanded rapidly in the late 19th century. The earliest successful efforts to form a cooperative business by raisin growers began in 1898. With community support, the California Associated Raisin Company was established in 1912. In 1915, the brand name Sun-Maid, coined by advertising executive E.A. Berg, was launched; and in 1918 the company opened a new facility near downtown Fresno, California.

By the early 1920s, the California Associated Raisin Company’s membership comprised 85 percent of the state’s raisin growers. The organization changed its name to Sun-Maid Growers of California in 1922 to identify more closely with its nationally recognized brand.

In 1964, further modernization and growth led to the construction of, and move to, a new facility in neighboring Kingsburg. To this day, the Kingsburg plant serves as the international headquarters of Sun-Maid Growers of California, but the corporate headquarters is located in Fresno, California.

In 2012, Sun-Maid celebrated its 100th anniversary as a grower cooperative.

Sun-Maid Girl

The original "Sun-Maid Girl" was a real person named Lorraine Collett. She attended the 1915 Panama–Pacific International Exposition in San Francisco as one of several young girls representing the California Associated Raisin Company. The Sun-Maid girls promoted the raisin industry by handing out raisin samples to visitors of the Expo while wearing white blouses with blue piping and blue sunbonnets.

A photograph of Collett appeared in the San Francisco Bulletin in 1915 and promoted Sun-Maid’s activities at the Exposition. While working at the Expo in San Francisco, Collett posed at the Post Street studio of artist Fanny Scafford in the morning, and then spent the rest of the day working the Expo, where the Sun-Maid girls were by then all wearing red bonnets. The artist experimented with a variety of positions and props, finally settling on the pose with an overflowing tray of grapes and a glowing sunburst in the background.

In May 1916, company executives agreed Collett would become the personification of the company. Her image with the sunbonnet and the tray of grapes was updated in 1956 and again in 1970, using drawings made a decade earlier of company employee Delia von Meyer (Pacheco). Collett continued to make special appearances as the original Sun-Maid Girl until her death at the age of 90.

The current version was created in 1970 by John Lichtenwalner, a freelance commercial artist in San Francisco. Lichtenwalner, a graduate of Art Center in Los Angeles, used the previous versions of the Sun-Maid Girl to create a cleaner version of the character. The model for the updated portrait was a young actress/model, Liz Weide. The portrait was centered over a figurative sunburst. The artwork, sold as piecework to the Sun-Maid Raisin Co., has been reproduced internationally and is perhaps the artist's best-known work, unchanged for more than 40 years.

In 2006, the Sun-Maid Girl was animated for television commercials in which she walked and talked for the first time. The commercials were designed and produced by Synthespian Studios.

Evolution of the brand

References

External links 
 Sun-Maid website

Agricultural marketing cooperatives
Agriculture in California
Companies based in Fresno, California
Food and drink companies established in 1912
Raisins
1912 establishments in California
Agricultural cooperatives in the United States